Steven Douglas Agee (born February 26, 1969) is an American comedian, actor, writer and musician, known for roles including Steve Myron on the Comedy Central series The Sarah Silverman Program and as John Economos in the DCEU superhero film The Suicide Squad (2021), the streaming television series Peacemaker (2022), and in the film Shazam! Fury of the Gods (2023). He also served as the on-set stand-in for Nanaue / King Shark.

Agee is also a musician. He played guitar and bass in various rock bands in the 1990s, and has collaborated with Brendon Small in the past. He played bass guitar in a commercial for Rocksmith 2014 and released a comedy-punk album, Scab, on September 4, 2021.

Filmography

Film

Television

Web

Video games

Writing credits
 2005–08: Jimmy Kimmel Live! (337 episodes)
 The Andy Milonakis Show

References

External links
 
 

1969 births
21st-century American male actors
American male comedians
American male film actors
American male television actors
American podcasters
American stand-up comedians
American television writers
Living people
American male television writers
Male actors from Riverside, California
Comedians from California
Screenwriters from California
21st-century American comedians
21st-century American screenwriters
21st-century American male writers